The SWPS University Press is the publishing house of SWPS University. It was established in 2002 as Academica. In 2011 Academica Press was renamed Wydawnictwo Uniwersytetu SWPS. It is located in the main university campus, on Chodakowska street in Warsaw. It publishes scientific journals, monographs and textbooks and books written by the university scientists.

Publications 
 Acta Sueco-Polonica
 Azja-Pacyfik
 Themis Polska Nova
 Kultura Popularna

References

External links 
 SWPS Official Website

SWPS University
University presses of Poland
Companies based in Warsaw
Publishing companies established in 2002